Kwaya is a Bantu language of Tanzania. Jita–Kara–Kwaya are close to being dialects; Maho (2009) separates Ruri from Kwaya as equally distinct.

Sample text (Hail Mary) 
Murembe, Maria, wizuye enema, omukama anawe, wabalikwa mu bagasi bone, na Yezu, mwana wamunda ayo yabalikwa. Maria mutakatifu, Nyira Ngumi, okisabire eswe abakayi ôri na mu nkaga yokufwa kweswe. Amina.

Translation 
Hail Mary, full of grace. The lord is with thee. Blessed are thou among women, and blessed is the fruit of thy womb, Jesus. Holy Mary, Mother of God. Pray for us sinners, now and at the hour of our death. Amen.

Languages of Tanzania
Great Lakes Bantu languages